Josh McDermitt (born June 4, 1978) is an American film and television actor and comedian. He is best known for playing Eugene Porter on AMC's The Walking Dead. In 2006, McDermitt appeared on Last Comic Standing as a contestant. McDermitt had a main role on the sitcom Retired at 35 from 2011 to 2012, playing the character Brandon.

Early life
He resides in Los Angeles, California, where he is a member of the improvisational comedy group Robert Downey Jr Jr.

Career
McDermitt began his career in entertainment by calling in to a local radio show in Phoenix, Tim & Willy, at a young age. Calling in routinely, under the guise of different voices, McDermitt kept listeners and Tim & Willy entertained. Not long afterward, he began working with them as a producer, following them to both KNIX & KMLE.

McDermitt was a semi-finalist in the fourth season of Last Comic Standing. He played the role of Larry in the 2009 TV movie Rehab for Rejects. McDermitt then starred in the TV Land sitcom Retired at 35, playing the role of Brandon. The show ran for two seasons from 2011–2012, before being canceled.

In October 2013, it was announced by producers that McDermitt had been cast as Eugene Porter, a character from The Walking Dead comic book, for the fourth season of the TV series of the same name. He was a main cast member from the fifth until the eleventh and final season.

Filmography

Video games

References

External links

 
 Josh McDermitt on TVLand.com
 

1978 births
Living people
21st-century American male actors
American male comedians
American male film actors
Place of birth missing (living people)
American male television actors
American people of Dutch descent
American people of Portuguese descent
Male actors from Phoenix, Arizona
21st-century American comedians